The spotted thick-toed gecko (Pachydactylus maculatus) is a species of lizard in the family Gekkonidae. It is found in South Africa and Eswatini.

References

Pachydactylus
Reptiles described in 1845
Taxa named by John Edward Gray
Reptiles of South Africa